The Last Mercenary  is a 1968 Spanish/West German/Italian international co-production of a modern-day Western.  It was directed by Mel Welles who was uncredited for financial funding reasons. The film was shot in Rio de Janeiro and Spain.

Plot
Following service in the Congo Crisis, two mercenary comrades in arms go their separate ways to new assignments. Mark Anderson flies to Rio de Janeiro where he is hired to protect mineral mines in the interior of Brazil from saboteurs.  The saboteurs have hired his friend.

Cast
Ray Danton - Mark / Marco Anderson 
Pascale Petit - Maria  
Günther Stoll - The Man in Black  
George Rigaud - Manuel de Lagos  
Inma de Santis - Isabel 
Vicente Roca - Gomez  
Carl Möhner - Steinmann  
Piero Sciumè - Felipe
Salvo Basile - Mine foreman
Mel Welles - Head villain

References

External links
 

1968 films
1960s action drama films
German action drama films
Italian action drama films
Spanish action drama films
West German films
Cold War films
Films set in Brazil
Films set in the Democratic Republic of the Congo
Films set in Rio de Janeiro (city)
Films shot in Rio de Janeiro (city)
Murder in films
Films about mining
1968 drama films
English-language German films
English-language Italian films
English-language Spanish films
Films about mercenaries
1960s Italian films
1960s German films